Harkleroad is a surname. Notable people with the surname include:
 Ashley Harkleroad (born 1985), American tennis player
 Bill Harkleroad (born 1949), American guitarist
 Bunky Harkleroad, basketball coach